Danuta Helena Siedzikówna (nom de guerre: Inka; underground name: Danuta Obuchowicz; 3 September 1928 – 28 August 1946) was a Polish medical orderly in the 4th Squadron of the 5th Wilno Brigade in Home Army. In 1946 she served with the Brigade's 1st Squadron in Poland's Pomerania region. Considered a national heroine, she was captured, tortured and sentenced to death at the age of 17 by the communist authorities.

Early life

Siedzikówna was born on 3 September 1928 in Guszczewina, near Narewka, Bielsk Podlaski. Her father, Wacław Siedzik, was a forester who had been sent to Siberia under the Tsar for being involved in pro-Polish independence organisations. He came back to Poland in 1923. In 1940 he was arrested by the NKVD and once again deported to Russia.

In 1941 her father Wacław Siedzik joined Władysław Anders' Polish Army (he died in Teheran in 1943). Her mother,  Eugenia, née Tymińska Prus III coat of arms, was a member of the Home Army and was killed by the Gestapo in September 1943. The son of Waclaw's sister, Paul Hur, finished the Polish Air Force Academy in Dęblin and took part in Battle of Britain. Siedzikówna grew up with her siblings Wiesława (1927–2004) and Irena (1931? - 1978) in the forester's lodge near Guszczewina.  After their father was exiled, then they moved to Narewka.  The girls attended grammar school in Narewka until 1939.  During the Second World War, until 1943 all three girls studied in the Salesian Sisters School in Różanystok near Dąbrowa Białostocka.

Second World War and thereafter

After their mother was murdered by the Gestapo in Białystok, together with her sister Wiesława, Danuta joined the Home Army in late 1943 or early 1944. As part of the underground army's training, she acquired medical skills. After the Soviets took Białystok from the German Nazis, she started work as a clerk in the forest inspectorate in Hajnówka.

Together with other employees of the inspectorate she was arrested in June 1945 by NKVD and UB for collaboration with the anticommunist underground. She was liberated from a prison transport convoy by a patrol of a Wilno group of ex-Home Army partisans commanded by Stanisław Wołonciej "Konus", a subordinate of Zygmunt Szendzielarz, "Łupaszko", who were operating in the area. "Konus" took the freed prisoners to "Łupaszko"'s camp where some of them, including Danuta, joined his group. Subsequently, Siedzikówna served as a medical orderly in the "Konus" troop, and then in the squadron of lieutenant Jan Mazur, "Piast", and that of lieutenant Marian Płuciński, "Mścisław". For a short period, her superior was also lieutenant Leon Beynar "Nowina", deputy of "Łupaszko", later known as "Paweł Jasienica" - a notable Polish historian and writer. During this time Danuta assumed the pseudonym "Inka".

The "Łupaszko" brigade was dissolved in September 1945 and Danuta went back to work in the forest inspectorate in Miłomłyn in Ostróda County under the name "Danuta Obuchowicz". However, the brigade was re-mobilized in response to Communist repressions in January 1946. In the early spring of 1946 Danuta came into contact with second lieutenant Zdzisław Badocha "Żelazny", the commander of one of Łupaszko's squadrons. After "Żelazny"'s death, the new commander, second lieutenant Olgierd Christa "Leszek", ordered Danuta to travel to Gdańsk in order to collect medical supplies.

She was arrested by the UB again on 20 July 1946 in Gdańsk. While in prison she was tortured and beaten but refused to give up any information about her contacts in the anti-communist underground and their meeting points. Danuta's brutal interrogations were personally supervised by the Head of the Investigations Department at the Voivodeship Office for Public Security, (WUBP), (Polish Secret Police) in Gdańsk, Józef Bik, vel Jozef Gawerski, vel Jozef Bukar.

In 1968, Bik, vel Bukar emigrated to Sweden, claiming antisemitic persecution. An IPN indictment against Bik, vel Gawerski, vel Bukar reads: "Jozef B. is accused of participating in court-sanctioned murders perpetrated against members of Polish Democratic Forces (pol. Polskie Siły Demokratyczne) and Polish Secret Army (pol. Polska Armia Tajna) whom he was beating and torturing in order to extract confessions".

Trial and death
She was charged with taking an active, violent part in an attack on functionaries of the Ministry of Public Security (Polish secret police) and the Milicja Obywatelska near village Podjazy as part of the Łupaszko unit, despite the fact that she was only a medic. She was accused of shooting at policemen and even issuing orders to other partisans.  However, the testimony submitted by MO and UB members involved in the fight was at best contradictory, as some claimed to have seen her shooting and giving orders, while others denied it altogether. One, named Mieczysław Mazur, testified that Siedzikówna had given him first aid after he was wounded by other partisans. She was charged with killing wounded policemen, a charge contradicted during her trial. The court decided she had not played a direct part in the attack.

Despite this and Siedzikówna's age (17), the court still sentenced her to death. The president of People's Republic of Poland, Boleslaw Bierut refused to grant her clemency (the request was submitted by Siedzikówna's public defender, which the prisoner herself refused to sign). Siedzikówna was executed (along with Feliks Selmanowicz, whose nom de guerre was "Zagończyk"), six days before her 18th birthday, on 28 August 1946, in a Gdańsk prison.

Days before the execution a secret letter from Inka was smuggled out of the prison, where she wrote: "Please tell my grandmother, that I have acted right."

The last minutes of her life are known from the testimony of Father Marian Prusak, the priest-chaplain called to give "Inka" and "Zagończyk" the last rites. According to Father Prusak both prisoners were calm before their execution. Siedzikówna, after taking the Sacrament of Penance, asked the priest to inform her family of her death and gave him their address. Afterward the two were executed in the basement of the prison, tied to wooden stakes. They both refused blindfolds. When the prosecutor gave the order for the execution squad to fire, both prisoners simultaneously shouted (in Polish) "Long Live Poland!" She remained alive and the coup de grâce was delivered by Franciszek Sawicki (other members of the firing squad refused to do so).

Her Protocol of Execution was signed by: Major Wiktor Suchacki (prosecutor), 2nd Lt. Franciszek Sawicki (firing squad leader), Captain Mieczysław Rutkowski (attending physician), and Jan Wójcik (jail warden).  The location of her remains remained unknown until 2014. They were discovered due to a nation-wide programme launched by the Institute of National Remembrance in 2003. The remains were confirmed as Siedzikówna's via DNA testing in 2015. On 28 August 2016, a state burial attended by President Andrzej Duda, was held in Gdańsk at the Garrison Cemetery for Siedzikówna and one of her companions.

Later events

Father Prusak did deliver the news of Siedzikówna's death to her family, although they had already found out through other sources. Unknown to him he was under UB surveillance, and in 1949 was charged with "espionage" for informing Danuta's family about her death. For that alone, he spent three and a half years in prison. After the fall of communism in Poland, the main Stalinist prosecutor in Danuta's trial who demanded the death penalty, Wacław Krzyżanowski, was brought up on charges of judicial murder twice (in 1993 and 2001). However, both times he was declared innocent of the charges. (Krzyżanowski argued that he had been only marginally involved with the case.)

Awards and recognition
On Polish Independence Day (11 November) 2006, President Lech Kaczyński posthumously awarded Danuta Siedzikówna the Commander's Cross of the Order of Polonia Restituta.

In 2017, the National Bank of Poland (NBP) introduced a 10-zloty silver commemorative coin, as part of the "Cursed Soldiers" series, in honour of Danuta Siedzikówna.

Cultural references

Film
In January 2007, a movie about Siedzikówna's last days, Inka 1946. Ja jedna zginę, featuring actress Karolina Kominek-Skuratowicz in the title role, was released by Teleplay.

In 2015, the TVP channel produced a documentary film Inka. Zachowałam się jak trzeba, directed by Arkadiusz Gołebiewski, portraying the life of Danuta Siedzikówna.

Music
In 2012, Polish hip-hop artist Tadek released a single "Inka" on his album Niewygodna prawda ("Inconvenient Truth") to pay tribute to the memory of Danuta Siedzikówna.

In 2013, Panny wyklęte, a music project by Dariusz Malejonek in collaboration with Polish singers including Marika, Natalia Przybysz and Halina Mlynkova devoted to the contribution of female members of the anti-communist movement, included singles "Walczyk" and "Jedna chwila" dedicated to Danuta Siedzikówna.

Theatre
In 2000, Tomasz A. Żak, working for the Nie Teraz Theatre, directed a stage play entitled Na etapie dedicated to the life of Danuta Siedzikówna.

Poetry
A poem entitled "Inka" appears in the 2011 poetry book Ars Lublinica by Katarzyna Bednarska.

Patronage

 Inka Park in Sopot (Polish: Park im. sanitariuszki Inki)
 Grammary School in Podjazy, near Sulęczyno in Kartuzy County in Pomeranian Voivodeship
 Gymnasium no 2 in Ostrołęka in Masovian Voivodeship
 Danuta Siedzikówna "Inka" High School no I in Wrocław
 3 Sokólska Drużyna Wędrownicza ZHP
 95 Tomaszowska Drużyna Harcerek "SZAROTKA ZHP belonged to Headquarters Hufiec ZHP in Piotrków Trybunalski
 1 Ostrołęcka Drużyna Harcerek "Ignis ZHR
 37 Gdyńska Drużyna Harcerek "Biedronki ZHR
 44 Mazowiecka Drużyna Harcerek "Kasjopea ZHR in Warszawy

Memorials
 Memorial plaque in St. Mary's Church, Gdańsk
 Memorial in Park imienia Sanitariuszki Inki, Sopot
 Monument at the Piotr Skarga Catholic High School, Warsaw
 Memorial near Narewka parish church
 Symbolic grave at the Garrison Cemetery, Gdańsk
 Monument in Jordan Park, Kraków
 Monument in Planty Park, Białystok
 Commemorative plaque, Butrimonys (Lithuania)

See also
 List of recipients of the Order of Polonia Restituta
 Wrongful execution
 Judicial murder
 Cursed soldiers

References

Links
Polonia Restituta Information website
Prospect about Inka, elknet.pl; accessed 7 May 2014.
Account of Execution given by Reverend Marian Prusak, "Inka's" Confessor, doomedsoldiers.com; accessed 7 May 2014.

1928 births
1946 deaths
People from Hajnówka County
Knights of the Order of Polonia Restituta
Women in World War II
Executed Polish people
People executed by the Polish People's Republic
Executed Polish women
Cursed soldiers
Home Army members
Polish female soldiers
Executed military personnel
People executed by Poland by firing squad
Executed people from Podlaskie Voivodeship
20th-century Polish women
Child soldiers in World War II